Angelika Bergmann-Kallwass (born 31 October 1948) is a German psychologist and television host.

Biography 
Angelika Bergmann-Kallwass was born in Cologne on 31 October 1948. After graduating from high school, she attended university, majoring in psychology and also studying economics.

Bergmann-Kallwass's career began with a teaching position at the Deutsche Angestellten-Akademie. In 2001, she became the host of the Sat. 1 TV show Kallwass greift ein!, formerly known as Zwei bei Kallwass.

Bergmann-Kallwass was married to Wolfgang Kallwass (1929—2018), a lawyer and psychologist, and has two daughters.

Since December 2016, Bergmann-Kallwass has been an official ambassador of the registered association intaktiv e.V., which campaigns against the circumcision of male children. She describes herself as an atheist and is a proponent of humanism.

Bibliography

References

External links 
 
 Zwei bei Kallwass

1948 births
Living people
Television people from Cologne
German psychologists
German television presenters
German women psychologists
German women television presenters
Sat.1 people